Nimrud Baito (born 1952 in Dohuk) was the Minister of Tourism in the Kurdistan Regional Government cabinet from 2006-2009. An ethnic Assyrian, Nimrud belongs to the Assyrian Patriotic Party. Trained as an electrical engineer, Baito worked in information technology at Hewlett-Packard for 10 years.

References

Living people
1952 births
Iraqi Kurdistani politicians
People from Duhok